

The James S. Brady Press Briefing Room is a small theater in the West Wing of the White House where the White House press secretary gives briefings to the news media and the president of the United States sometimes addresses the press and the nation. It is located between the workspace assigned to the White House press corps and the office of the press secretary.

History
The first presidential press conference was held in March 1913 in the Oval Office, during the presidency of Woodrow Wilson. Subsequently, until 1969, communications from the president and general press news conferences took place in various locations, including the Indian Treaty Room, the State Department auditorium, and the White House East Room. 

In 1969, to accommodate the growing number of reporters assigned to the White House, President Richard Nixon had the indoor swimming pool, which had been installed by the March of Dimes for Franklin D. Roosevelt, covered and turned into press offices and a lounge that could double as a briefing room.  

In 2000, the room was renamed the "James S. Brady Press Briefing Room" in honor of James Brady, the White House Press Secretary who had been shot and permanently disabled during an assassination attempt on President Ronald Reagan in 1981.

Renovation
In December 2005, the White House announced the intention to renovate the aging Press Briefing Room and cramped press corps offices.  On August 2, 2006, the final briefing was held, and President George W. Bush hosted several previous press secretaries at a closing ceremony and there was some hesitation and concern about whether the press would be allowed to return to the White House. In the interim, the White House Conference Center was used as temporary location for press conferences.

President Bush reopened the renovated room in a ribbon-cutting ceremony on the morning of July 11, 2007. He held his first formal press conference in the new briefing room the next day, following the release of a report on the progress of the Iraqi government. The modernization cost nearly US$8.5 million. Of that sum, $2.5 million was funded by the media, and the remainder was funded from tax revenue. Each correspondent's seat was priced at $1,500. Beneath the current press room lies the former White House swimming pool that has since become a computer server room.

Location

References

External links 

 

Mass media in the United States
Rooms in the White House
Swimming venues in Washington, D.C.